Master (also stylized as MA$TER) is a South Korean action crime film directed by Cho Ui-seok. Written jointly by Cho Ui-seok and Kim Hyun-duk, it stars Lee Byung-hun, Gang Dong-won and Kim Woo-bin in the lead roles. The narrative centers around the manhunt for a conman launched by South Korea's financial crime unit after he absconds with the money and assumes a new identity, causing a cop to team up with the conman's mastermind partner in order to crack the case involving a nationwide financial fraud leads to the Southeast Asian haven for scam artists, thieves, and criminals: Metro Manila.

The film opened theatrically in South Korea on 21 December 2016, and received more than 7 million admissions nationwide. Released on 1,501 screens, it grossed more than $48 million at the South Korean box office.

Plot
An intellectual crime investigation team goes after company One Network. The company is involved in a massive fraud case.

Cast

Main cast
Lee Byung-hun as President Jin, a con man of the One Network fraud case.
Gang Dong-won as Kim Jae-myung, head of the Criminal Investigation team
Kim Woo-bin as Park Jang-goon, The mastermind and the brains of President Jin.

Supporting cast
Uhm Ji-won as Shin Gemma, a lieutenant in the police investigation team
Oh Dal-su as Hwang Myung-joon, a corrupt prosecutor
Jin Kyung as Kim Mi-yong, also known as Mother Kim, an advertising executive

Others 

 Woo Do-hwan as Man with baseball cap backwards
 Jung Won-joong as Chief of the National Police Agency
 Yoo Yeon-soo as Bureau director Han
 Jo Hyun-chul as Ahn Kyung-nam
 Park Hae-soo as President Jin's bodyguard
 Lee Soon-won as Criminal Investigation Team member 1
 Bae Jung-nam as Criminal Investigation Team member 2
 Jung Soo-gyu as Criminal Investigation Team member 3
 Kim Jung-woo as Criminal Investigation Team member 4
 Heo Hyung-gyi as Criminal Investigation Team member 5
 Joo Seok-tae as Peter Kim
Lee Dong-jin as Male employee
Kim Won-sik as Secretary Han
 Jang Yool as One Network employee

Special appearance 
 Kim Byeong-ok
 Park Jung-ja as Teacher Shin
Monsour del Rosario as Senator of the Philippines
Ian Ignacio as Bodyguard
Diego Salvador as Bodyguard 
Lei Arellano as Bodyguard

Production
Filming began on 23 April 2016. Filming took around 2 months time in the Philippines, including Binondo, Intramuros, Bulacan, and Cebu.

Marketing 
The film was showcased at the American Film Market held in Santa Monica, California from November 2–9. It has been sold to 31 countries including the United States, Canada, Australia, New Zealand, Italy, Taiwan, Thailand, Hong Kong, Singapore, the Philippines and other countries.

Release and box office
The VIP Premiere of Master was held on 19 December 2016 at CGV Yeongdeungpo in Seoul.

Master was initially released in South Korea and was screened at 1,448 theatres. As per the Korea Box Office Information System (KOBIS) tallied by the Korean Film Council (KOFIC) on the first day of the release 393,247 viewers were attracted and took 66.3 percent of the total box office sales that day.

According to the Korean Film Council, Master topped the box office charts and became the most watched movie during the Christmas weekend of 2016 in South Korea. It was reported an audience of about 2.2 million viewed the movie.
In the first five days since its opening on 21 December, the film has reached three million mark in ticket sales, earning 24.8 billion won (Approx: USD 20.5 million) in total.

As of early February 2017, Master has grossed US$49.81 million in South Korean box office and has sold 7.14 million tickets according to the Korean Film Council. Master ended up as the No. 11 bestselling film for 2016 in Korea.

Awards and nominations

References

External links
 Master on CJ Entertainment website
 
 Master on Naver
 Master on Daum
 Master on Movist

2016 films
CJ Entertainment films
2010s Korean-language films
2016 crime action films
2010s chase films
South Korean crime action films
South Korean chase films
2010s South Korean films